= Koubaita =

Inland town of ancient Bithynia

Coordinates: 40°47′28″N 29°56′54″E

Koubaita was an inland town of ancient Bithynia inhabited during Roman times. Its name does not occur in ancient authors, but is inferred from epigraphic and other evidence.

Its site is located near Gündoğdu in Asiatic Turkey.
